Pavalakkodi may refer to:
Pavalakkodi (1934 film), a Tamil language film
Pavalakodi (1949 film), an Indian Tamil-language film
Pavalakkodi (2003 film), a Tamil language drama film